Francis Xavier DiLorenzo (April 15, 1942 – August 17, 2017) was an American prelate of the Roman Catholic Church. He served as bishop of the Diocese of Richmond in Virginia from 2004 until his death in 2017.

Previously DiLorenzo was the fourth bishop of the Diocese of Honolulu in Hawaii and as an auxiliary bishop of the Diocese of Scranton in Pennsylvania from 1988 to 1994.

Biography

Early life 
DiLorenzo was born on April 15, 1942, in Philadelphia, Pennsylvania, the oldest of three children of Samuel and Anita Porrino DiLorenzo. He attended St. Callistus School and St. Thomas More High School, both in Philadelphia.  He then entered St. Charles Borromeo Seminary in Wynnewood, Pennsylvania.

Priesthood 
DiLorenzo was ordained to the priesthood by Cardinal John Krol in Philadelphia on May 18, 1968, at age 26. DiLorenzo studied in Rome, earning a Licentiate in Sacred Theology from the Alphonsian Academy and a Doctor of Sacred Theology degree from the Pontifical University of St. Thomas Aquinas.  DiLorenzo returned to the United States to work at Saint Pius X High School in Pottstown, Pennsylvania as a chaplain and teacher of theology.  He later served as chaplain and associate professor of moral theology at Immaculata College in East Whiteland Township, Pennsylvania.

In 1983, Pope John Paul II named DiLorenzo as a chaplain of his holiness.  That same year, he was appointed vice rector of St. Charles Borromeo Seminary, eventually becoming rector. DiLorenzo also served on the Archdiocesan Committee and was a prosynodal judge of the Metropolitan Tribunal. He was named by the Vatican as a member of the Papal Household and received the title prelate of honor of his holiness.

Auxiliary Bishop of Scranton 
On January 26, 1988, Pope John Paul II appointed DiLorenzo as an auxiliary bishop of the Diocese of Scranton and titular bishop of Tigias;  he was consecrated on March 8, 1988, by Bishop James Timlin.

In 1994, Bishop Joseph Ferrario of the Diocese of Honolulu requested that the Holy See accept his resignation due to poor health. Pope John Paul II appointed DiLorenzo as apostolic administrator of the diocese, while still serving in Scranton, on October 12, 1993.

Bishop of Honolulu 
Pope Paul II appointed DiLorenzo as bishop of the Diocese of Honolulu on November 29, 1994.  His installation included hula dancing. In attendance were Archbishop Agostino Cacciavillan,  Cardinal Pio Taofinu'u  and Archbishop John R. Quinn. In 1997 DiLorenzo defended the use of hula in a variety of religious services in the diocese despite the Holy See's prohibition on liturgical dance, calling the hula a native "sacred gesture".

At the 2002 convention of the U.S. Conference of Catholic Bishops (USCCB), DiLorenzo spoke in favor of tighter restrictions on priests accursed of sexual abuse of minors.  The new policy, adopted by the USCCB, prohibited accused priests from interacting with parishioners, but allow them to remain in the priesthood.

On January 29, 2003, DiLorenzo removed Reverend Roberto Batoon as pastoral administrator of Molokai Catholic Community, a cluster of parishes on the Island of Molokai in Hawaii.  Batoon had been accused of sexual abuse by several individuals when he was a priest in the Philippines.DiLorenzo is often credited with creating the first zero tolerance policy on allegations of sexual abuse at the hands of priests—a policy that came about well before the Catholic sex abuse scandals that plagued the rest of the nation in the early 2000s.

Bishop of Richmond 
On March 31, 2004, John Paul II appointed DiLorenzo as bishop of the Diocese of Richmond. He was installed there on May 24, 2004.

Personnel changes 
Upon his installation, DiLorenzo reactivated the diocese's liturgical commission and named Father Russell Smith parochial vicar at Saint Elizabeth Ann Seton Parish in New Kent County as diocesan theologian, a post that had been vacant since 1998. As theologian, Father Smith would examine for conformance to Catholic teaching all draft documents and issue approvals authorizing the publication of all printed materials generated by the diocese. Smith also would: (1) approve in advance any person who wishes to speak anywhere on Catholic church property in the diocese; (2) investigate complaints from parishioners who complain about liturgical abuses in a particular church and respond; and (3) recommend sanctions against persons responsible for such abuse to DiLorenzo. DiLorenzo noted that these kinds of checks and controls were needed because, he alleged, some people in the diocese were used to living outside the traditional boundaries of Catholicism.

Bishop DiLorenzo forcibly retired Father Thomas J. Quinlan, pastor of Holy Family Catholic Church in Virginia Beach for a history of using offensive language during mass.  It culminated with what DiLorenzo termed a sacrilegious reference to Mary, mother of Jesus, at a Christmas Eve Mass.  Although a significant number of parishioners appealed against the decision, many applauded it, wondering why DiLorenzo had not acted sooner.

Diocesan administration 
DiLorenzo moved his residence from Cathedral Place in Richmond to Midlothian, Virginia. Some Catholics raised questions about the move and see it as a way to distance himself from his flock. But DiLorenzo responded that he is only 25 minutes away from the diocesan offices and that the move saved the diocese money: "Do I need to live in a three-story building by myself? I don't think so." The three-story house was turned into offices for those working in a building that the diocese was renting for $35,000 a year. "We saved ourselves thirty-some thousand a year," said DiLorenzo, "and I moved to Midlothian, a very quiet place."

DiLorenzo ended the diocesan sexual minorities commission, which his predecessor had established in 1977.He explained his decision: "What was being done was not a ministry. It was trying to make a statement... for people who see themselves discriminated against. The statement that needed to be made has been made. We are not going to make a big deal about what your fantasy sexual life is". He added that there are moral expectations for everyone: "I think most people would agree that the ministry is to call all persons to Jesus Christ in discipleship. The gender issue was not raised by Jesus.... Jesus called everyone to holiness. Are there certain groups in our population that need help in that journey?"

DiLorenzo increased the number of clustered parishes. He also brought in consultants to review some diocesan departments and commissions that need to be abolished.

San Lorenzo Spiritual Center controversy 
In 2004, DiLorenzo was drawn into a controversy at the San Lorenzo Spiritual Center in Virginia Beach, Virginia.  The center is a spiritual and cultural organization for 23,000 Filipinos living in Hampton Roads, Virginia area. In April 2004, a group of current and former members of the center had sent a petition to DiLorenzo, alleging various acts committed by Reverend Pantaleon Manalo, the center administrator. They accused Manalo of committing financial improprieties, accumulating unexplained personal wealth, missing annual financial reports, abusing his power and making inappropriate sexual statements.

In response, the vicar forane for the diocese, Monsignor Thomas J. Caroluzza, asked for Manalo's resignation in December 2004. On December 10, 2004, DiLorenzo terminated Manalo's position, but then temporarily stayed that decision. After further investigation, DiLorenzo announced that Manalo had done no wrong, since the diocese had investigated the center and not Manalo.  However, DiLorenzo ordered him to resign from his leadership post. DiLorenzo appointed Father Salvador Anonuevo, pastor of Saint Luke Parish in Virginia Beach, as the new center administrator.  Manalo was allowed to continue there as a spiritual director  

Manalo then sued the petitioner group, seeking $1.35 million for defamation. On August 1, 2005, Judge Padrick of the Circuit Court of Virginia dismissed the defamation lawsuit, terming it an "intrusion into church affairs and violated the religious protections of the U.S. Constitution and the Virginia Constitution".

In January 2007, DiLorenzo removed Reverend Rodney L. Rodis from public ministry.  The pastor of Immaculate Conception Parish in Buckner, Virginia, and St. Jude Parish in Mineral, Virginia,  Rodis had been arrested for the theft of over $600,000 from the two parishes.  During the course of its investigation, the diocese discovered that Rodis had a wife and three children living in a nearby county.

Retirement 
In early 2017, DiLorenzo sent a letter of resignation as bishop of the Diocese of Richmond to Pope Paul II in early 2017.  Francis DiLorenzo died from heart and kidney failure on August 17, 2017, at St. Mary's Hospital in Richmond, Virginia, at age 75.

See also
 

 Catholic Church hierarchy
 Catholic Church in the United States
 Historical list of the Catholic bishops of the United States
 List of Catholic bishops of the United States
 Lists of patriarchs, archbishops, and bishops
 Sexual abuse scandal in Honolulu diocese

References

External links
 Catholic Diocese of Richmond
 Catholic Diocese of Honolulu
 Catholic Diocese of Scranton

Episcopal succession

1942 births
2017 deaths
Roman Catholic bishops of Honolulu
Roman Catholic bishops of Richmond
American people of Italian descent
Clergy from Philadelphia
20th-century Roman Catholic bishops in the United States
21st-century Roman Catholic bishops in the United States
People from Midlothian, Virginia